The Graham-White Type VII "Popular" was an early British aircraft designed  by J. D. North and built by the Grahame-White Aviation company, with the intention of producing a low-cost aircraft to popularize aviation. It was initially produced with a 35 hp Anzani 3-cylinder Y configuration engine and offered for sale at a price of less than £400.  Despite its low price the aircraft included structural refinements such as hollow-section interplane struts. It was first flown in 1913.

Design and development
To maintain the leading edge section there were half-ribs between each rib, these extending from the leading edge to the main spar. A single horizontal tailplane with a split elevator and a rudder divided into two part, half above and half below the tailplane, were carried on ash booms behind the wing, the booms being connected by hollow wooden vertical struts and tubular steel horizontal members. The booms were spindled to an I-section except at the points of attachment of the cross-members.   
The upper wing was double the span of the lower and had wide-span ailerons occupying the whole trailing edge outboard of the tail booms. The wings were connected by a single pair of struts on either side, the outer section of the upper wing being braced by wires leading to inverted-V kingposts.  The wide-track undercarriage consisted of a pair of long laminated wood skids each bearing  pair of wheels on a short axle. No tailskid was fitted.

The Type VII was built in both single and two seat versions and some were fitted with the  Gnome Omega engine, which would have increased the price considerably as well as improving performance, since this engine cost around £500.

Operational history
In March 1913, the British War Office, in an attempt to boost the numerical strength of the Royal Flying Corps announced the purchase of seven aircraft from the Grahame-White company, including two Type VII Populars and one two-seat VIIc Popular Passenger Biplane (which despite the name was unrelated to the single-seat Type VII). Although the purchase of two of the single-seat type VIIs was announced, it appears that only one was taken on charge. While allocated the serial number 283, the aircraft saw little if any use by the RFC.

Specifications

Notes

References

 Bruce, J. M. The Aeropanes of the Royal Flying Corps (Military Wing). London: Putnam, 1982. .
Lewis, P British Aircraft 1809-1914 London: Putnam 1962 p. 281

Grahame-White aircraft
1910s British sport aircraft
Biplanes
Single-engined pusher aircraft
Aircraft first flown in 1913